The county governor of Vestfold og Telemark county in Norway represents the central government administration in the county.

Vestfold og Telemark county (with its current borders) was established on 1 January 2020 after the merger of the old Telemark and Vestfold counties. In preparation for the county merger, the government of Norway merged the offices of County Governor of Vestfold and County Governor of Telemark into one office starting on 1 January 2019.

The county governor is the government's representative in the county. The governor carries out the resolutions and guidelines of the Storting and government. This is done first by the county governor performing administrative tasks on behalf of the ministries. Secondly, the county governor also monitors the activities of the municipalities and is the appeal body for many types of municipal decisions.

Names
The title of the office was originally  but on 1 January 2021, the title was changed to the gender-neutral .

List of county governors
Vestfold og Telemark county has had the following governors:

See also
For the county governors of this area prior to 2020, see: 
List of county governors of Telemark
List of county governors of Vestfold

References

Vestfold og Telemark
County Governor